2005 in Korea may refer to:
2005 in North Korea
2005 in South Korea